Chicago Underground may refer to:

Chicago Underground Film Festival, founded in 1994
Chicago Underground (jazz ensemble), an avant-garde jazz duo/trio/quartet/orchestra led by Rob Mazurek and Chad Taylor 
Chicago Underground Library, a collection focusing on material produced by small presses or independent publishers